The Womble District Administration House No. 1 is a historic house in the Ouachita National Forest.  It is located on the north side of United States Route 270, east of Mount Ida and just west of the highway's crossing of Williams Stream.  It is a -story wood-frame structure, with a side-gable roof, novelty siding, and stone foundation.  Its main facade, facing south, has a projecting gable-roofed porch, whose gable is finished in vertical board-and-batten siding.  It was built about 1940 by a crew of the Civilian Conservation Corps as the administrative headquarters of the Womble District of the national forest.

The house was listed on the National Register of Historic Places in 1993.

See also
National Register of Historic Places listings in Montgomery County, Arkansas

References

Houses on the National Register of Historic Places in Arkansas
Houses completed in 1940
Ouachita National Forest
Civilian Conservation Corps in Arkansas
Government buildings completed in 1940
National Register of Historic Places in Montgomery County, Arkansas
1940 establishments in Arkansas
Government buildings on the National Register of Historic Places in Arkansas